The 1980 Svenska Cupen final took place on 20 June 1984 at Råsunda in Solna. The match was contested by Allsvenskan sides Malmö FF and IK Brage. Brage played their first cup final ever, Malmö FF played their first final since 1978 and their 13th final in total. Malmö FF won their 11th title with a 7–6 victory after extra time and penalties.

Match details

External links
Svenska Cupen at svenskfotboll.se

1980
Cupen
Malmö FF matches
IK Brage matches
June 1980 sports events in Europe
Association football penalty shoot-outs